Gherardo di Giovanni di Miniato del Fora (1445–1497), was an Italian painter and illuminator.

Biography
He was born in Florence as the son of the sculptor Giovanni di Miniato del Fora. He inherited his father's nickname of "Del Fora" in the history books. He is also known as "Master of the Triumph of Chastity". Besides paintings such as Christ and the Virgin Mary Interceding for Humanity, he is known for miniatures, mosaics, and jewelry. He had many commissions for members of the Medici family in Florence and also worked for King Matthias Corvinus in Hungary. His landscapes show the influence of Early Netherlandish painters.

He died in Florence.

References

Gherardo di Giovanni di Miniato del Fora on Artnet

1445 births
1497 deaths
15th-century Italian painters
Italian male painters
Painters from Florence